Regnitzlosau is a municipality in Upper Franconia in the district of Hof in Bavaria in Germany, on the border with the Czech Republic. Regnitzlosau was established in 1234 by three members of the nobility: Cunradus de Lasan, Arnoldus de Lasan and Ciban de Lasan.

References

External links
Official website (in German)
Protestant Church of Regnitzlosau (in German)

Hof (district)